Oregon City is the county seat of Clackamas County, Oregon, United States, located on the Willamette River near the southern limits of the Portland metropolitan area. As of the 2020 census, the city population was 37,572. Established in 1829 by the Hudson's Bay Company, in 1844 it became the first U.S. city west of the Rocky Mountains to be incorporated.

History 

Known in recent decades as the site of several large paper mills on the Willamette River, the city played a significant role in the early history of the Oregon Country. It was established by Hudson's Bay Company's Dr. John McLoughlin in 1829 near the confluence of the Clackamas River with the Willamette to take advantage of the power of Willamette Falls to run a lumber mill. During the 1840s and 1850s it was the destination for those wanting to file land claims after traveling the Oregon Trail as the last stop on the trail.

It was the capital of the Oregon Territory from its establishment in 1848 until 1851, and rivaled Portland for early supremacy in the area. In 1846, the city's newspaper, the Oregon Spectator, was the first American newspaper to be published west of the Rocky Mountains. Oregon City College was established in 1849 as a Baptist school, but was defunct by the 1870s. Oregon City was the site of the Beaver Coins Mint, producing the short-lived independent Oregon Territory currency in 1849.

The center of the city retains part of its historic character through the preservation of houses and other buildings from the era of the city's founding.

Former Latin archdiocese 
The town became the see city of the first Roman Catholic archdiocese in the western United States, when the diocese of Oregon City, established in 1846, was raised to metropolitan rank, with Archbishop François Norbert Blanchet as its ordinary. Its territory included all of the western United States. The population in the area of Oregon City declined due to the California Gold Rush. The population of nearby Portland grew, and the headquarters of the archdiocese was moved there in 1926. In 1928 the name Archdiocese of Portland in Oregon replaced the former name. No longer a residential bishopric, Oregon City is now a titular see.

Neighborhoods 

Oregon City has several neighborhoods represented by official neighborhood associations:

 The Park Place neighborhood is in the northeastern corner of the city, located on a bluff overlooking Abernethy Green.  The neighborhood includes a housing project, as well as numerous rural properties. Park Place, formerly an independent community, also includes unincorporated areas outside the city limits. First called Clackamas (a name that was later given to a community three miles (5 km) north), then Paper Mill, the community was finally named Park Place for a park in a nearby oak grove. Park Place was platted in 1889, and a post office was established the following year. For a while the name was changed to "Parkplace."
 The Two Rivers neighborhood is the primarily commercial lowest-elevation area of town including downtown Oregon City, the End of the Oregon Trail Visitor's Center at Abernethy Green, and Clackamette Park. It borders the Clackamas and Willamette rivers to the north and west and Park Place to the east and McLoughlin to the south. I-205 runs through the north part of the neighborhood.

 The McLoughlin neighborhood is bordered by Washington Street and Singer Hill on the Northwest, a bluff overlooking Abernethy Creek on the northeast and east, and Division Street on the south.  It also includes extends to the west to border the Canemah district.  The John McLoughlin House and the upper entrance to the Municipal Elevator are located in this neighborhood.
 The Barclay Hills neighborhood lies between Rivercrest Neighborhood on the west, the city limits on the east, the McLoughlin Neighborhood on the north, and Warner-Milne Road on the south.  This neighborhood is bisected by Molalla Avenue, the former route of Oregon Route 213 before it was moved to the Oregon City Bypass to the east.
 The Canemah neighborhood lies along Oregon Route 99E, and is a narrow strip of land sandwiched between the Willamette River and a bluff.  Canemah was once an independent city before being annexed into Oregon City. Canemah was founded in 1845 and was the portage site around Willamette Falls for many years. It was supposedly named after an Indian chief.
 The Rivercrest neighborhood includes Rivercrest Park, and the residential communities overlooking the Willamette River to the west.
 The South End neighborhood lies to the southwest of Rivercrest Neighborhood.  It centers around the intersection of South End and Warner-Parrot roads, and was the location of Oregon City's (now defunct) drive-in movie theater.
 The Hazel Grove/Westling Farm neighborhood lies in the southwestern corner of the city, lying between the bluffs over the Willamette River and the unincorporated areas to the south.
 The Tower Vista neighborhood lies southeast of South End, and east of Hazel Grove/Whistling Farm.  It is bordered on the east and southeast by Leland Road.
 The Hillendale neighborhood lies south of Warner-Milne Road, east of Leland Road, north of Clairmont Way and Beavercreek Road, and west of OR 213 and the city limits.  The former site of City Hall is located here, as is the Clackamas County jail.
 The Gaffney Lane neighborhood, centered around the elementary school of the same name, lies south of Hillendale, west of OR 213, and north/east of the city limits.
 The Caufield neighborhood contains those parts of the city located south of Park Place, and east of OR 213.  Clackamas Community College is located here, as is Oregon City High School.

Geography 
The town is divided into upper and lower areas. The lower area is on a bench next to the Willamette River. The upper area is atop a bluff composed of Canemah basalt, which flowed about 2.5 million years ago from a vent  to the southeast in the Boring Lava Field. For many years, Indian trails connected the two levels, but stairs were built in the 19th century. In 1915 the town built the water-powered Oregon City Municipal Elevator to connect the two parts, which was converted to electricity in the 1920s. In 1952, a new electric elevator was constructed with the specification that it was to be "as plain as possible and without ornament."

The major waterways of Oregon City include the Willamette River, which flows along the northwest side of the city, and the Clackamas River, which merges with the larger Willamette to the north of the city. The Willamette forms the boundary between Oregon City and West Linn; the Clackamas serves as the boundary between Oregon City and Gladstone.

Willamette Falls 

The Willamette Falls Locks in West Linn were the first multi-lift navigational locks in the United States and are now a National Historical Site, no longer in use. The first long-distance electrical service in the United States originated in Oregon City in 1889, transmitting electricity  to Portland.

Climate 

Oregon City has a Mediterranean climate. The Mediterranean climate regime resembles the climate of the lands in the Mediterranean Basin, parts of western North America, parts of Western and South Australia, in southwestern South Africa and in parts of central Chile. The climate is characterized by hot, dry summers and cool, wet winters.

Economy 

For much of its existence, Oregon City's economy has been dominated by the forestry industry, until the decline of the Pacific Northwest lumber industry started in the 1980s. At its height, several mills operated in the city and surrounding communities. The last paper mill in the immediate vicinity closed in 2017.

With the growth of the Portland Metro region, Oregon City has become largely a suburb of Portland. Tourism is a growing sector with the emphasis on the city's history and the major renovation of the Willamette Falls area into a public-access, mixed-use space through the Willamette Falls Legacy Project.

Government 
Oregon City is governed by a Mayor and a City Commission composed of the Mayor and four Commissioners elected from the City at large for terms of four years each.

Oregon City was the capital of the Oregon Territory until 1851; the following governors served during that time:
George Abernethy, provisional governor of the Oregon Country 1845–48
Joseph Lane, first governor of the Oregon Territory, 1848–50
Kintzing Prichette, 2nd Territorial Governor of Oregon, 1850
John P. Gaines, 3rd Territorial Governor of Oregon, 1850–53.  During his term (and against his wishes), the territorial capital of Oregon moved to Salem.

Education 
The city, and several surrounding communities, is served by the Oregon City School District, a public school district consisting of 7 elementary schools, two middle schools, a traditional four-year high school (Oregon City High School), and an alternative secondary school. Several schools in the district offer bilingual English/Spanish programs. Oregon City High School is the third most populated high school in Oregon, and is a state and national power in girls' basketball, winning three consecutive USA Today girls' national championships in the 1990s.

The city also is the home of Clackamas Community College, numerous private and parochial schools, and a public library that is part of the Library Information Network of Clackamas County.

Points of interest

Museums and historic buildings

Museums include the Museum of the Oregon Territory and the End of the Oregon Trail Interpretive Center, with costumed "living history" guides.  The Clackamas County Historical Society archives, housed in the Museum of the Oregon Territory, also include the incorporation plat for the city of San Francisco.  Clackamas Heritage Partners owns and operates these museums, along with the Stevens Crawford Museum.  In 2009, Clackamas Heritage Partners announced that it could no longer afford to keep the museums open.  The End of the Oregon Trail Interpretive Center was closed to the public indefinitely in September 2009; the Stevens Crawford Museum and Museum of the Oregon Territory, staffed largely by volunteers, continued to operate on a limited schedule.
The End of the Oregon Trail Interpretive Center eventually reopened during the summer of 2013 with the support of grants and donations from numerous sources.

The Stevens-Crawford Heritage House Museum is a 1908 structure with 11 furnished rooms; exhibiting furniture from the collection of the Clackamas County Historical Society to replicate an Edwardian era home and Progressive Era narrative. Other historical buildings in Oregon City include the McLoughlin House, the Ermatinger House (oldest in Clackamas County), the Ainsworth House, the Harvey Cross House, and the First Congregational Church.

The Oregon City Bridge over the Willamette River, built in 1922, is listed on the National Register of Historic Places, as is the Oregon City Municipal Elevator.

Parks
Oregon City has over 22 city parks.  One of the city's larger parks is Clackamette Park, at the confluence of the Clackamas and Willamette Rivers. The park's features include RV camping, a boat launch and dock, a skateboard park, and other recreational facilities.  Several community festivals are held there throughout the year.  Other major parks include Chapin, Hillendale, Jon Storm Park, Rivercrest, and the new Wesley Lynn.

Transportation

Road

Interstate 205 passes through the city's northern edge, and is the only freeway to serve the city. In addition, three state highways (Oregon Route 43, Oregon Route 99E, and Oregon Route 213) pass through or terminate in Oregon City. The former two serve the city's downtown core, the latter provides service to the southern parts of Oregon City.

Rail
The Union Pacific Railroad mainline passes through the city. The city also has an Amtrak station, which is served twice daily in each direction by Amtrak Cascades trains running between Portland and Eugene, Oregon. The Coast Starlight (Seattle-Los Angeles) passes through but does not stop.

Air
There are no public airports within the city. A small private airfield is along Beavercreek Road, south of Oregon City.

Water
The Willamette River in Oregon City is navigable to small craft, and Oregon City has a thriving fishing and recreational boating industry. The Willamette Falls Locks once allowed boats to navigate around the falls. The Clackamas River is not navigable, except for the lowermost portions.

Mass transit
As part of the greater Portland metropolitan area, Oregon City is served by TriMet, the regional transit authority, with several bus lines which converge at the Oregon City Transit Center. Until 1958, an interurban trolley line operated by the now-defunct Portland Traction Company connected Oregon City with Portland; remnants of this line are still visible (such as an abandoned bridge across the Clackamas River, just east of the OR 99E bridge). In more recent years, the city operated a "historic trolley" service during the summer months, primarily to serve the needs of tourism, but the vehicles used were trolley-replica buses, rather than actual trolley cars, and in 2013 it was decided to discontinue that service and sell the vehicles.

Two other public agencies provide transit service in Oregon City, supplementing that of TriMet. Canby Area Transit (CAT) operates regular service on Oregon Route 99E between the Oregon City Transit Center and Canby. SMART, South Metro Area Regional Transit, serving Wilsonville, connects to CAT in Canby. CAT also has service to Woodburn.

Dial-a-ride service is operated by TriMet, but CAT also operates within the Oregon City city limits for trips originating or terminating in the CAT service area. If transfers between TriMet and CAT are necessary, they are accomplished at the Oregon City Transit Center (OCTC) at 11th & Main, which is at the northeast end of the downtown area.

Demographics

2010 census

As of the census of 2010, there were 31,859 people, 11,973 households, and 8,206 families residing in the city. The racial makeup of the city was 91.1% White, 0.6% African American, 0.9% Native American, 1.7% Asian, 0.2% Pacific Islander, 2.3% from other races, and 3.1% from two or more races. Hispanic or Latino of any race were 7.3% of the population.

There were 11,973 households, of which 36.5% had children under the age of 18 living with them, 50.7% were married couples living together, 12.4% had a female householder with no husband present, 5.4% had a male householder with no wife present, and 31.5% were non-families. 23.5% of all households were made up of individuals, and 8.3% had someone living alone who was 65 years of age or older. The average household size was 2.61 and the average family size was 3.07.

The median age in the city was 36.3 years. 25.5% of residents were under the age of 18; 8.8% were between the ages of 18 and 24; 28.8% were from 25 to 44; 25.7% were from 45 to 64; and 11.2% were 65 years of age or older. The gender makeup of the city was 49.3% male and 50.7% female.

2000 census
As of the census of 2000, there were 25,754 people, 9,471 households, and 6,667 families residing in the city. The racial makeup of the city was 92.44% White, 1.12% Asian, 1.08% Native American, 0.58% African American, 0.11% Pacific Islander, 2.15% from other races, and 2.53% from two or more races. Hispanic or Latino of any race were 4.98% of the population.

There were 9,471 households, out of which 36.6% had children under the age of 18 living with them, 53.0% were married couples living together, 12.3% had a female householder with no husband present, and 29.6% were non-families. 22.4% of all households were made up of individuals, and 7.8% had someone living alone who was 65 years of age or older. The average household size was 2.62 and the average family size was 3.06.

In the city, the population was spread out, with 27.0% under the age of 18, 10.3% from 18 to 24, 32.5% from 25 to 44, 20.5% from 45 to 64, and 9.7% who were 65 years of age or older. The median age was 33 years. For every 100 females, there were 96.8 males. For every 100 females age 18 and over, there were 94.7 males.

The median income for a household in the city was $45,531, and the median income for a family was $51,597. Males had a median income of $38,699 versus $29,547 for females. The per capita income for the city was $19,870. About 6.5% of families and 8.9% of the population were below the poverty line, including 11.0% of those under age 18 and 7.5% of those age 65 or over.

Notable people
In addition to John McLoughlin, the "Father of Oregon" and chief factor of the Hudson's Bay Company, and Vietnam-era Medal of Honor recipient Larry G. Dahl, Oregon City has been home to the following: 

Oregon pioneers

John C. Ainsworth (1822–1893), pioneer, businessman, steamship captain
J. T. Apperson, steamboat captain, politician
George H. Atkinson (1819–1889), pioneer, missionary, co-founder of Pacific University
Asahel Bush (1824–1913), pioneer, printer, founder of the Salem Statesman Journal
Tabitha Moffatt Brown (1780–1858), pioneer, co-founder of Pacific University
John H. Couch (1811–1870), sea captain and trader
Philip Foster (1805–1884), settler and businessman
Amory Holbrook (1820–1866), mayor, attorney
Robert Newell (1807-1869), fur trapper, mountain man, frontier doctor, newspaper editor, politician, Indian agent
Peter Skene Ogden (1790–1854), explorer and fur trader
Samuel Parker (1806–1886), politician, pioneer
Peter G. Stewart (1809–1900), pioneer, politician, watchmaker
William G. T'Vault (1806–1869), pioneer, postmaster, publisher
Aaron E. Waite (1813–1898), pioneer, first chief justice of the state of Oregon
Alvin F. Waller (1808–1872), pioneer, missionary

Political activists
William Simon U'Ren (1859-1949), lawyer, known as the Father of the Oregon System of government.

Writers
 Jeffrey St. Clair (1959–), journalist and author
 M. K. Hobson (1969–), science fiction writer
 Kenneth Scott Latourette (1884–1968), historian
 Edwin Markham (1852–1940), American Poet Laureate

Performing artists
 Ron Saltmarsh  (1962–) Music composer
 Meredith Brooks (1958–), singer/songwriter
 Louis Conrad Rosenberg (1890–1983), artist and architect
 Susan Ruttan (1948–), actress
 Jack Taylor (actor) (1936–), actor

Businesspeople
Melville Eastham (1885–1964), businessman (founded General Radio Company), engineer, radio pioneer
David Eccles (1849–1912), railroadman and businessman

Athletes
 Brian Burres (1981–), major league baseball pitcher
 Jeff Charleston (1983–), professional football player
 Ed Coleman (1901–1964), major league baseball player
Rich Fellers (born 1959) - Olympic equestrian Team USA.
 Jeff Lahti (1956–), major league baseball pitcher
 Matt Lindland (1970–), Olympics silver medalist in wrestling, mixed martial artist
 Dan Monson (1961–), basketball coach
 Jonah Nickerson (1985–), pitcher for the Oregon State Beavers voted Most Outstanding Player of 2006 College World Series
 Dean Peters (1958–1998), professional wrestler alias "Brady Boone"
 Brad Tinsley (1989–), basketball player
 Trevor Wilson (1966–), former major-league pitcher for the San Francisco Giants and Anaheim Angels
 Lindsey Yamasaki (1980–), professional women's basketball player

Sister cities 
According to Sister Cities International, Oregon City has one sister city:
 Tateshina, Nagano, Japan

See also 

 Canemah, Oregon
 Cayuse Five
 Steamboats of the Willamette River
 USS Oregon City

References

External links 

 Official Website
 Entry for Oregon City in the Oregon Blue Book
 Historic Oregon City
 Oregon City Chamber of Commerce
 Oregon City community profile from the Oregon Infrastructure Finance Authority

 
1829 establishments in Oregon
Cities in Clackamas County, Oregon
Cities in Oregon
County seats in Oregon
Former colonial and territorial capitals in the United States
Oregon Trail
Populated places established in 1829
Populated places on the Willamette River
Portland metropolitan area
Willamette Valley